, playing as , is a Japanese professional football team based in Okazaki, Aichi Prefecture. They currently play in Japan Football League, the Japanese fourth tier of nationwide football league system.

History 
The club has been established in 1968 as the corporate team of Maruyasu Industries. In 1976 the team won promotion to Tōkai Soccer League where remained ever since except for 2003 and 2004 seasons when they suffered relegation to Division 2. The club has won the league in 2013 and though they were unable to take up one of three promotion-granting places in the Regional League promotion series, they were admitted to in JFL in 2014 season by the league board.

Before their first season on the nationwide level the club has changed its name to FC Maruyasu Okazaki in order to appeal more to the local community.

League & cup record 

Key

Honours 
Tokai Soccer League Division 2
 Champions 2004

Tokai Soccer League Division 1
 Champions 2013

Current squad 
As of 9 March 2023.''

Club officials

Managerial history

References

External links 
 Official Site 

 
Football clubs in Japan
Sports teams in Aichi Prefecture
Japan Football League clubs
Association football clubs established in 1968
1968 establishments in Japan
Maruyasu Okazaki